Teufenbach is a former municipality in the district of Murau in the Austrian state of Styria. Since the 2015 Styria municipal structural reform, it is part of the municipality Teufenbach-Katsch.

Geography
Teufenbach lies in the upper valley of the Mur.

References

Cities and towns in Murau District